Swedish pop singer Robyn has released eight studio albums, one compilation album, six extended plays, 50 singles (including 17 as a featured artist), nine promotional singles, and 45 music videos.

Robyn became known in the late 1990s for her worldwide dance-pop hit "Do You Know (What It Takes)" from her debut album Robyn Is Here (1995). She co-wrote the song "Du gör mig hel igen" ("You Make Me Whole Again") for Melodifestivalen 1997. The popularity of her number-one hit single "With Every Heartbeat", and subsequent album release Robyn (2005), brought her mainstream success worldwide. In January 2009, Robyn won a Swedish Grammis award for Best Live Act 2008.

Robyn released the first of a trilogy of albums to be released over the course of 2010 titled Body Talk Pt. 1, in June of that year, peaking at number one in Sweden. It was her first album since Robyn. The album's lead single "Dancing On My Own", released a few weeks prior to the album's release, became a hit single worldwide, and brought her a 53rd Grammy Awards nomination for the category of Best Dance Recording. A follow-up album, Body Talk Pt. 2, was released on 6 September, entering straight at number one on the Swedish chart, and the final album of the trilogy, Body Talk, was released on 22 November 2010 with the first single "Indestructible". The last Body Talk single was "Call Your Girlfriend", which was released in the United States in May 2011 and became her first number-one hit on Billboards Hot Dance Club Play chart.

Albums

Studio albums

Reissues

Compilation albums

Extended plays

Singles

As lead artist

As featured artist

Promotional singles

Other charted songs

Guest appearances
These songs have not appeared on a studio album released by Robyn.

Songwriting credits
Robyn has also written songs for other artists.

Music videos

As lead artist

As featured artist

Notes

References

External links
 
 
 
 

Discographies of Swedish artists
Electronic music discographies
Pop music discographies
Discography